Natać may refer to the following places in Poland:

Natać Mała
Natać Wielka